The Allegheny Wesleyan Methodist Connection (AWMC), originally the Wesleyan Methodist Church (Allegheny Conference), and also known as the Wesleyan Methodist Church (WMC), is a Methodist denomination within the conservative holiness movement primarily based in the United States, with missions in Peru, Ghana, and Haiti.

History 

The first official Methodist organization in the United States occurred in Baltimore, Maryland, in 1784, with the formation of the Methodist Episcopal Church at the Christmas Conference with Francis Asbury and Thomas Coke as the leaders.

Though John Wesley originally wanted the Methodists to stay within the Church of England, the American Revolution decisively separated the Methodists in the American colonies from the life and sacraments of the Anglican Church. In 1784, after unsuccessful attempts to have the Church of England send a bishop to start a new Church in the colonies, Wesley decisively appointed fellow priest Thomas Coke as superintendent (bishop) to organize a separate Methodist Society. Together with Coke, Wesley sent The Sunday Service of the Methodists, the first Methodist liturgical text, as well as the Articles of Religion, which were received and adopted by the Baltimore Christmas Conference of 1784, officially establishing the Methodist Episcopal Church. The conference was held at the Lovely Lane Methodist Church, considered the Mother Church of American Methodism.

The new Church grew rapidly in the young country as it employed circuit riders, many of whom were laymen, to travel the mostly rural nation by horseback to preach the Gospel and to establish churches until there was scarcely any village in the United States without a Methodist presence. With 4,000 circuit riders by 1844, the Methodist Episcopal Church rapidly became the largest Protestant denomination in the country.

The Allegheny Wesleyan Methodist Connection specifically traces its origin to the Wesleyan Methodist Church which was a Methodist denomination in the United States organized on May 13, 1841. The church withdrew from the Methodist Episcopal Church because of disagreements regarding abolitionism, church government, and the doctrine of holiness according to the Discipline of the Wesleyan Methodist Connection (1841). The first secessions in 1841 took place in Michigan although the new church group was formalized in Utica, New York. In November 1842, Orange Scott, La Roy Sunderland and J. Horton seceded from the M. E. Church for reasons given in their publication of the "True Wesleyan." The following month Luther Lee and L. C. Matlock followed. The first general conference was held in Utica, NY in October, 1844. Later the name was changed to The Wesleyan Methodist Connection of America.

The Allegheny Conference of the Wesleyan Methodist Church entered into a schism with the rest of the Wesleyan Methodist Church because it favored a connexional polity and opposed the merger of the Wesleyan Methodist Church with the Pilgrim Holiness Church; it thus became the Allegheny Wesleyan Methodist Connection while the rest of the Wesleyan Methodist Church became the Wesleyan Church. While it officially operates under the name "Allegheny Wesleyan Methodist Connection (Original Allegheny Conference)" due to an agreement during the merger between the Wesleyan Methodist Church and the Pilgrim Holiness Church in 1968, most of the churches continue to be called Wesleyan Methodist.

Campgrounds 

In 1900 the Allegheny Conference of the Wesleyan Methodist Church purchased land in Stoneboro, Pennsylvania to be used for a camp meeting ground; it is known as Methodist Campground. Located next to this campground is the Stoneboro Wesleyan Methodist School which was built in 1965. The denomination continues to hold its annual conference at its campgrounds in the month of June, and its historic annual camp meeting in the month of August. The denomination has other smaller campgrounds that also hold camp meetings throughout its geographic territory, such as the smaller campground located in Belsano, Pennsylvania.

Educational institutions 
It operates Allegheny Wesleyan College, a four-year Bible college dedicated to preparing Christian ministers, missionaries, and teachers. It is located in Salem, Ohio. Allegheny Wesleyan Methodist Connection also runs Northwest Indian Bible School (NIBS) in Alberton, Montana. In addition, the Allegheny Wesleyan Methodist Connection has sixteen Christian schools in Pennsylvania, Ohio, Montana, and New Mexico.

Missions 
The Allegheny Wesleyan Methodist Connection runs 33 missions, with 20 more missions being added since 1968. These are located in Haiti, Ghana, Peru, as well as among Native Americans of the United States and Canada.

Publications 
The Allegheny Conference of the Wesleyan Methodist Church publishes a monthly periodical known as The Allegheny Wesleyan Methodist. It also runs a radio program known as Wesleyan Gospel Echoes.

Gallery

See also

Interchurch Holiness Convention
Bible Methodist Connection of Churches
Evangelical Wesleyan Church
Primitive Methodist Church
Quiverfull

References

External links
Allegheny Wesleyan Methodist Connection - Conference President's Perspective
Discipline of the Allegheny Wesleyan Methodist Connection
Salem WMC
White Memorial WMC
Indiana WMC
Allegheny Wesleyan College

Methodist denominations
Methodist denominations in North America
Holiness denominations
Holiness movement
History of Methodism in the United States
Religious organizations established in 1843
Methodist organizations established in the 18th century
Protestant denominations established in the 18th century
1843 establishments in the United States